Funny Little Bunnies is a Silly Symphonies animated Disney short film. It was released in 1934.

Plot
The short is set in the enchanted dell of the titular Easter bunnies, which according to the storybooks, can be visited by those who believe the stories of the Easter bunnies are true. They show how they make the various treats associated with them in preparation for Easter.

Voice cast
 Main bunnies: The Rhythmettes (including Mary Moder, Mae Questel, and Dorothy Compton)
 Singing chickens: Dot Farley, Louise Myers, and Florence Gill

Home media
The short was released on December 4, 2001, on Walt Disney Treasures: Silly Symphonies - The Historic Musical Animated Classics.

Book adaptation
The 1951 Little Golden Book Grandpa Bunny was loosely based on Funny Little Bunnies. It was written by Jane Werner, based on an adaptation by Dick Kelsey and Bill Justice.

References

External links
 

1934 films
1934 short films
1934 animated films
1930s Disney animated short films
Easter Bunny in film
Animated films about rabbits and hares
Films directed by Wilfred Jackson
Films produced by Walt Disney
Silly Symphonies
Films scored by Frank Churchill
Films scored by Leigh Harline
Animated films without speech
1930s American films